Eike is a village in Karmøy municipality in Rogaland county, Norway. The village is located along the western shore of the Førresfjorden, just southeast of the town of Haugesund. The village of Eike, lies just south of the border with the neighboring municipality of Tysvær. Eike is considered part of the larger urban area of Førre, which is centered over the border in Tysvær.

References

Villages in Rogaland
Karmøy